Alice Gerrard (born July 8, 1934) is an American bluegrass singer, banjoist, fiddler, and guitar player. She performed as part of a duo with Hazel Dickens, and as part of The Strange Creek Singers (with Dickens, Mike Seeger, Tracy Schwarz, and Lamar Grier) and The Back Creek Buddies (with Matokie Slaughter).

Gerrard was born in Seattle, Washington. Her mother was from Yakima, Washington, and her father from Wigan in England. Gerrard attended Antioch College, where she was exposed to folk music. After college, she moved to Washington, D.C. and became part of the thriving bluegrass scene there. Gerrard was married to Jeremy Foster who later died in a car accident. She had four children with him. She was later married to Mike Seeger and recorded two albums with him.

Garrard was inducted into the Bluegrass Hall of Fame in 2017.

The Alice Gerrard Collection (1954–2000) is located in the Southern Folklife Collection of the Wilson Library of the University of North Carolina at Chapel Hill.

She founded and was editor-in-chief of The Old Time Herald from 1987 to 2000.

Discography

Alice Gerrard
1994 - Pieces of My Heart (Copper Creek Records)
2002 - Calling Me Home: Songs of Love and Loss (Copper Creek Records)
2013 - Bittersweet (Spruce And Maple)
2014 - Follow the Music (Tompkins Square)

With Hazel Dickens
1965 - Who's That Knocking (Folkways LP)
1973 - Hazel & Alice (Rounder LP)
1973 - Won't You Come & Sing for Me (Folkways LP)
1976 - Hazel Dickens and Alice Gerrard (Rounder LP)
1996 - Pioneering Women of Bluegrass (Smithsonian Folkways)
2018 - Sing Me Back Home: The DC Tapes, 1965-1969 (Free Dirt Records)

With Mike Seeger
1970 - Mike and Alice Seeger Live in Japan (King LP)
1980 - Alice Gerrard & Mike Seeger [reissued in its entirety on Bowling Green CD, 2008]

Tom, Brad & Alice
1998 - Been There Still   
2000 - Holly Ding
2001 - We'll Die in the Pig Pen Fighting
2005 - Carve That Possum

With Gail Gillespie and Sharon Sandomirsky
2007 - The Road to Agate Hill: Music from Southwest Virginia and Beyond

Compilations
1979 - Elizabeth Cotten, Volume 3: When I'm Gone (Folkways Records)
1997 - Close to Home: Old Time Music from Mike Seeger's Collection, 1952-1967 (Smithsonian Folkways)
2001 - There is No Eye: Music for Photographs (Smithsonian Folkways)
2002 - Classic Mountain Songs from Smithsonian Folkways (Smithsonian Folkways)
2002 - Classic Bluegrass from Smithsonian Folkways (Smithsonian Folkways)
2005 - Classic Bluegrass Vol. 2 from Smithsonian Folkways (Smithsonian Folkways)

Films
Homemade American Music  Directed by Yasha Aginsky, Carrie Aginsky. Copyright: 1980.
Hazel Dickens: It's Hard to Tell the Singer from the Song (2001). Directed by Mimi Pickering. Whitesburg, Kentucky: Appalshop.
You Gave Me a Song: The Life and Music of Alice Gerrard (2019). Directed by Kenny Dalsheimer. Durham, North Carolina: The Groove Productions.

Other
Her name appears in the lyrics of the Le Tigre song "Hot Topic."

References

External links
Alice Gerrard biography
Alice Gerrard Collection, Southern Folklife Collection, University of North Carolina at Chapel Hill
Gerrard Discography at Smithsonian Folkways

1934 births
Living people
American banjoists
American women singers
American bluegrass musicians
American folk singers
Antioch College alumni
Musicians from Seattle
21st-century American women